The 1935 France–Italy rugby union match was a match organized by the international Federation of amateur rugby, that took place in Rome on April 22, 1935. The game between Italy and France was the only game of the competition, although it is not registered in the annals of French rugby history. France won the game 44 - 6 over Italy, with the game being held at the Stadio Flaminio.

Final

Notes and references 

 FIRA Trophy, France - Italy

Bibliography 
 Francesco Volpe, Paolo Pacitti (Author), Rugby 2011, pg 212.

External links
 FIRA-AER official website

France
Italy match
France